Mack Anthony Atkins (18 August 1931 – 25 June 2019) was an Australian rules footballer who played with Hawthorn in the Victorian Football League (VFL).

Notes

External links 

2019 deaths
1931 births
Australian rules footballers from Victoria (Australia)
Hawthorn Football Club players